Dorival may refer to:

People

Given name
 Dorival Caymmi (1914–2008), Brazilian singer, songwriter, actor and artist
 Dori Caymmi (born 1943), Dorival Tostes Caymmi, Brazilian singer, songwriter and producer
 Dorival Júnior (born 1962), Brazilian football manager and former defensive midfielder
 Doriva (born 1972), Dorival Guidoni Júnior, Brazilian football manager and former midfielder
 Dorival Thomas (born 1976), Brazilian football defender
 Doriva (footballer, born 1987), Brazilian football defensive midfielder

Surname
 Géo Dorival (1879–1968), French poster artist
 Jérôme Dorival (born 1952), French clarinetist, and composer
 Dudley Dorival (born 1975), Haitian hurdler

Other uses
 Dorival (brand), ibuprofen brand in the Caribbean and Latin America produced by Bayer